Chelodina murrayi is an extinct species of snake-necked turtle from the Waite Formation on the Alcoota Scientific Reserve, north-east of Alice Springs in the Northern Territory of Australia. The species would appear to belong to the Chelodina novaeguineae group of species within the subgenus Chelodina.

References

 

Chelodina
Miocene turtles
Fossil taxa described in 2013
Extinct animals of Australia
Turtles of Australia